Doraneh (also Romanized as Dorāneh; also known as Darneh, Darowneh, Darūneh, and Dowrāneh) is a village in Fazl Rural District, Zarrin Dasht District, Nahavand County, Hamadan Province, Iran. At the 2006 census, its population was 205, in 54 families.

References 

Populated places in Nahavand County